Marc Thompson may refer to:

Marc Thompson (cyclist) (born 1953), American cyclist
Marc Thompson (footballer) (born 1982), English footballer
Marc Thompson (voice actor) (born 1975), American voice actor

See also
Mark Thompson (disambiguation)